The White Space is a 2009 Italian drama film directed by Francesca Comencini. It entered the main competition at the 66th Venice International Film Festival.

Cast 

Margherita Buy as Maria
Giovanni Ludeno as Fabrizio
 as  Giovanni Berti
 as  Magistrata
Antonia Truppo| as Mina 
Guido Caprino as Pietro

Production
First time Margherita Buy undresses in front of the camera. To combat embarrassment, the director Francesca Comencini also undressed completely during the shoot, so as to put Buy at ease.

See also 
 List of Italian films of 2009

References

External links

2009 films
Italian drama films
Films directed by Francesca Comencini
2009 drama films
2000s Italian films
Fandango (Italian company) films